The Libertas Americana was a medal made to commemorate the American Revolution. It was designed in part by Benjamin Franklin.

A Libertas Americana was showcased on season 15 of the American reality television series Pawn Stars. It was sold for 150,000 dollars.

History 
The medal was originally conceived by Benjamin Franklin after being asked to create a monument in honor of the Siege of Yorktown. Franklin outlined his idea in a letter to Robert Livingston on 4 March 1782. The reverse design was further developed by Esprit-Antoine Gibelin and Augustin Dupré.

Design 
The obverse of the medal features the goddess Liberty. Beside her is a pole adorned with a Phrygian cap. The reverse features the infant Hercules representing the United States being attacked by a lion representing the United Kingdom. The infant, who is shown strangling two snakes, is being protected by Athena who represents France. The reverse includes the motto NON SINE DIIS ANIMOSUS INFANS, from Horace's ode "Descende coelo", which translates to "The infant is not bold without the aide of the gods."

References 

American Revolution
1782 in the United States
Benjamin Franklin
Liberty symbols
Athena in art
Lions in art
Snakes in art